Alberto de la Campa y Roff (28 October 1918 – May 1964) was a Cuban diplomat.

Campa served as the Cuban Ambassador to Italy until January 3, 1959, when he resigned when the government of Fidel Castro overthrew Fulgencio Batista.

Campa was married to Martha de la Torre y Silva, and they had three children, Adela Maria, Miguel Angel, and Alberto. He was the son of another Cuban diplomat Miguel Ángel de la Campa y Caraveda.

References
 Reading Eagle; Envoy Resigns; 3 January 1959, Page 3.

Cuban diplomats
Ambassadors of Cuba to Italy
1918 births
1964 deaths